Chad William Zielinski (born September 8, 1964) is an American prelate of the Roman Catholic Church who is the fifth bishop of the Diocese of New Ulm in the state of Minnesota. He previously served as Bishop of the Diocese of Fairbanks in Alaska from 2014 to 2022.

Biography

Early life and education 
Chad Zielinski was born on September 8, 1964, in Detroit, Michigan, the eldest of five children to Donald and Linda Zielinski.  A short time later, the family moved to a farm near Alpena, Michigan.  After he graduated from Alpena High School, Zielinski and a friend drove to Alaska to work in a fish processing plant for the summer. Zielinski started college in 1982, but then decided to drop out and join the United States Air Force (USAF).  While stationed in Idaho, he attended Boise State University in Boise, Idaho, and Park College.  Zielinski's membership in the Knights of Columbus and the influence of base chaplain in Idaho prompted him to consider the priesthood.

After completing his Air Force service in 1986, Zielinski enrolled in Mount Angel Seminary in St. Benedict, Oregon, earning a Bachelor of Philosophy degree.  He studied for the priesthood at Sacred Heart Major Seminary in Detroit, earning a Master of Divinity degree in 1996.

Priesthood 
Zielinski was ordained into the priesthood for the Diocese of Gaylord on June 8, 1996, by Bishop Patrick R. Cooney at St. Mary Cathedral in Gaylord, Michigan. After his ordination, Zielinski served in the following Michigan parishes:

 Parochial vicar at Immaculate Conception in Traverse City until 1998 
 Pastor of St. Philip Neri in Empire 
 Pastor at St. Rita-St. Joseph in Maple City

Zielinski was elected to the Presbyteral Council in 1999. Beginning in 2000, he also served as the pastor for administrative affairs of the Diocesan Mission to Hispanics.

Military service 
After the terrorist attacks of September 11, 2001, Bishop Cooney released Zielinski from the diocese to serve in the USAF Chaplain Corps.  He served combat tours in Iraq and Afghanistan, celebrating mass with mortar fire in the background. Zielinski was stationed at Grand Forks Air Force Base in Grand Forks, North Dakota, from 2002 to 2003 and at RAF Mildenhall in Suffolk, England, from 2003 to 2005.

The USAF then assigned Zielinski to the HQ Air Force Recruiting Service at Randolph Air Force Base in Schertz, Texas, followed by a stint as cadet chaplain at the United States Air Force Academy in Colorado Springs, Colorado, from 2009 to 2012.  From 2012 to 2014, Zielinski served as chaplain at Eielson Air Force Base in Fairbanks, Alaska. Zielinkski was promoted to major in 2013. He was discharged from the Chaplain Corps before his installation as bishop.

Bishop of Fairbanks 

Pope Francis named Zielinski as bishop of the Diocese of Fairbanks, Alaska on November 8, 2014. When named to Fairbanks, he was the first active duty chaplain in the US Armed Forces to be appointed a Catholic bishop. He was consecrated on December 15, 2014, by Archbishop Roger Schwietz. Archbishop Timothy Broglio and Bishop Steven J. Raica were the principal co-consecrators. The liturgy was held in the Carlson Center in Fairbanks.

In a diocese in which only nine of 46 parishes are accessible by road, the clergy, including Zielinski, spend a large amount of time traveling to small remote villages in rough conditions. Zielinski said:

Bishop of New Ulm 
On July 12, 2022, Pope Francis named Zielinski the fifth bishop of the Diocese of New Ulm in Minnesota. He was installed on September 27, 2022.

See also

 Catholic Church hierarchy
 Catholic Church in the United States
 Historical list of the Catholic bishops of the United States
 List of Catholic bishops of the United States
 Lists of patriarchs, archbishops, and bishops

References

External links

 Roman Catholic Diocese of New Ulm Official Site 
 Roman Catholic Diocese of Fairbanks Official Site 

 

1964 births
Boise State University alumni
Living people
Clergy from Detroit
Military personnel from Detroit
People from Alpena County, Michigan
United States Air Force chaplains
Mount Angel Seminary
Roman Catholic Diocese of Gaylord
Roman Catholic bishops of Fairbanks
Roman Catholic bishops of New Ulm
21st-century Roman Catholic bishops in the United States
Religious leaders from Michigan
Bishops appointed by Pope Francis
Catholics from Michigan